Thomas Henry Reilly (August 3, 1884 – October 18, 1918) was a right-handed Major League Baseball shortstop who played for three seasons. He played for the St. Louis Cardinals from 1908 to 1909 and the Cleveland Naps in 1914. He played his first game on July 27, 1908 and his last game on July 3, 1914.

He was born in St. Louis, Missouri and died of pneumonia in New Orleans, Louisiana.

References

External links

1884 births
1918 deaths
Major League Baseball shortstops
St. Louis Cardinals players
Cleveland Naps players
Gulfport Crabs players
Gulfport-Biloxi Sand Crabs players
Topeka Jayhawks players
Louisville Colonels (minor league) players
Sioux City Packers players
Des Moines Boosters players
New Orleans Pelicans (baseball) players
Atlanta Crackers players
Baseball players from Missouri
Deaths from pneumonia in Louisiana